The Tashons people (Chin language; Taisun (or) Tlaisun; Burmese: တာရွှန်) are ethnic tribes that live in the Falam Township, in the central part of Chin State, Myanmar. The Tashons were the most powerful tribes in the north of the Chin Hills prior to the British Empire's annexation of the region. Their influence extended over the borders of Manipur in the north, Hualngo and Lusai Hills in the west, the Phau River in the south and the Kalay-Kabaw Valley and Zanniat land in the east. They practiced a democratic system where the position of Chief was attained not by the virtue of birth but by vote of the people. The Tashons tribe and their villages were ruled by the Fahlam Council or Tashon Democratic Council, locally known as Nam Kap. The Tashons people have their own language, customs and culture.

Origins of the Tashon 
Legend has it that the original parents of Pu Tashon came out of a solid rock locally known as Lailun, located in Falam Township. Lailun is also believed to be the mythical birthplace of the Chin ancestors. Pu Thuan Kai (Brother of Phurh Hlum and Ral Thang) believed to be one of the first chief of Lailun . Today, the descendants of Pu Thuan Kai i.e. Hlawncheu (eldest and ancestors of Chiefs), Zahau (Second eldest and also ancestor of Chiefs), Hauhulh (Third in line and ancestors of Chiefs), and the aboriginals(Natives who are descendants of Pu Tashon) are Hlampi, Hlawnmong, Tungsawh, Tothuang Upa, Tothuang Nauta, Zahre Upa, Zahre Nauta, Conthawng, Hringngen, Thla-um, Kaltsiing, Cawilawn and Saza are known as Tashons (Taisun Hrinkhat).

The Founding of Fahlam 
Around AD 1500, Pu Tashon moved out from Lailun and established a village in his name i.e. Tashon village. Tribal wars were common at that time and this village was attacked several times by various tribes. When this village was attacked, the Tashons usually hid their children and elders in a secure place, approximately a mile away from the village. There, the Tashons later established a village called Fa-Hlam. According to the hearsay of the Tashons "Fa" means "Children" and "Hlam" can be interpreted as "Secure place", thus, the name Fa-Hlam could be literally translated as the secure place where people live peacefully. The Tashon village and Fahlam village were separate villages.

Their old village Tashon was largely abandoned and the reason for its abandonment was due to superstition. The reason for its abandonment was that a beautiful Burmese maiden, finely dressed in silks and jewels, appeared in a cave in the rocks above the Tashon village. Whoever looked on this Burmese Medusa, however, quickly perished; hence they established a new village Fahlam and migrated there. The village of Fahlam had six quarters with 600 households prior to the British annexation. When the British entered the village in 1892, the household was recorded to be at approximately 500. The village was divided in to six quarters i.e. Butu, Laiko, Phangpho, Hliap, Khawthar, Lu-ung and the quarter chiefs were elected by the Fahlam council. Today, the Tashon village still has three quarters namely Butu, Phangpho and Khawthar. The Tashons were known in various names, such as ‘Tashon’ by the Burman and the British, ‘Phalamte’ after their principle village by the Sizang and Tedim, ‘Fahlam’ or ‘Tlaisun’ by their neighbours, however, they called themselves ‘Tashons (or) Taisun’.

Rise to the Power 
After Fahlam was established by the Tashons, they gradually brought all their neighbours under their control. The Tashons were keen traders and they came to control the entire east and west trade between the Lushai, central Chin Hills and the Kalay Valley. They maintained a good relationship with the Swabwa of Kalay Valley where major goods such as salt, iron, ornaments and others were imported. They established a trade route between Fahlam and Kalay Valley and built the suspension bridge over the Manipur river. It was the only known established trade route between the northern Chin and the plain at that time.

Before 1890, other Chin tribes raided the Kalay-Kabaw valleys and carried whatever they could, back to the Chin Hills. Being the most influential tribe, the Tashons could exercise their authority over other tribes in Chin Hills. During those days, the Sawbwa of Kalay and the Fahlam council made a defensive and offensive alliance. The Fahlam Council gave protection to the Kalay valley i.e. whoever raided the Kalay valley were severely punished by the Fahlam council. The Fahlam council destroyed Hrimpi (a Hakha village) because it raided the Burmese village of Kungyi. In return, the Kalay Sawbwa gave sole trading right to the Tashons which meant the Tashons got salts, irons and other items from the plains and distribute throughout Chin Hills which earned them large profit. This had enabled the Fahlam council to hold a monopoly of the trade in Chin Hills, as they are able to undersell all other traders; and to further ensure that there should be no competition, they put every obstacle in the way of other villages going to the plains. Their control over trade was also the key factor to hold their power. Their political system, their skill in diplomacy and their alliance with the Shan of the Kale valley enabled them to become the most powerful tribes in Chin Hills. The tribes became very powerful and their ancestral song runs thus: 
The great Fahlam has been born;
No one will ever conquer us;
Our fame spreads beyond the land we could reach;
And it shines like the sun.
Although their influence reached over vast areas in the Chin Hills, their authority did not extend to administration of the vassal tribes but it did include "protective custody" of the whole area, so that if any tribe behaved badly the Tashons could and would organise a punitive expedition, composed of the toughest men in all the other tribes under their control, to smite the offender [HNC Stevenson]. They held a unique position in Chinland at that time. All the tribes from Manipur to Hakha and from Burma to Lushai owed them nominal allegiance. They hold their position in Chin Hills, not so much through their prowess in the field as through their ingenuity and thus uphold their rule over the whole.

Administration of The Tashon Chiefs (The Fahlam Council)
Tashons were the only tribes who practiced democracy system prior to the British annexation, whereas, other tribes in Chin Hills practice feudalism. The Tashons area were administered by a council of five chiefs, who were all chosen from the villages such as Fahlam (Taisun), Conghte, Congheng and Zamual. The known councillors from the Fahlam Council are as follows:   
Pu Bawi Khal (circa 1650-1700 AD), 
Pu Hlawn Kim, Pu Lian Bik & Pu Sang Rul (circa 1700 - 1750 AD), 
Pu Lian Nawn & Pu Hniar Vum (circa 1750 – 1820 AD), 
Pu Kip Bik (father of Pu Con Bik), Pu Kha Lian & Pu Hoi Hlum (circa 1820 – 1856 AD). 
From 1865 until the British annexation of Chin Hills i.e. 1892, the Fahlam Council was led by Pu Con Bik known by the Burmese and British as Son Pek. The other council members were Pu Mang Hlur, Pu Cong Khar, Pu Bawi Hmung and Pu Kha Lian. Pu Kha Lian and Pu Mang Hlur served in the council led by Pu Kip Bik. They continued to serve in the council led by Pu Con Bik. The post of councillor was attained, not by virtue of birth, but by the vote of the people. Only when a common man who is particularly conspicuous as a soldier, who shows his skills in trade and diplomacy, who attain the highest social class among the Tashons society was elected to be the Councillor. If one person was chosen to be a Councillor then they promoted him through marriage so that he belonged to the council families.

Unity is Strength
For the people of Tashons, the absolute power lies with the Fahlam council. "Unity is strength" was the Fahlam motto. Each day, the council met in the morning at the house of one of the council members and they discussed tribal affairs including making decisions on cases brought to the court, and matters related to revenue. The Fahlam council members always adopted a democratic procedure to elaborate on matters concerning administration or judicial concern before coming to a decision. In Fahlam, none of the councillors alone had the power to decide any case. The council members had to discuss everything and the people are very envious of the power and prestige. E.B. Elles writes "The chiefs have more power in their tribe than any other Chin tribes. This is because they never act separately, but together after consultation"

In some important matters like going to war, the Fahlam council convened a federal council meeting in which not only the chief or council members but also elders of the main village and others satellite tribes participated. When the British invaded Chin Hills, the Fahlam council had managed to raise 3,000 warriors from all tribes, all corners of Chin Hills and stood against the invading enemy. The use of their system allowed not only the Chin people to be united but also to show loyalty to each other, the recognize virtue of the Chin people. Tribal wars were fought numerous times among each other, however, in time of danger, the Fahlam council managed to unite the Chin people to fight side by side against the British Empire.

Early Relations with the British 
The Kingdom of Myanmar fell under the British Empire in 1885, however, Chin Hills did not fall automatically under the British colonial rule. Chin Hills at that time was independent nation and the Myanmar King Thibaw authority did not reach over Chin Hills. After the Burmese capital Mandalay was occupied, the British force then moved to the Burma western borders and annexed Kalay valley in 1886. The British administration in Burma disposed the Swabwa (ruler) of Mang Yit and appointed his nephew Sawbwa Maung Pa Gyi on 1 January 1887. The British administration in Burma and their western neighbour, the Chin people started to have contact in 1887. The upper Burma political officer, Captain F.D. Raikes arrived in Kalaymyo on and sent out messengers to the chiefs of Fahlam (Tashon), Sizang, Kamhau, Sukte, Zokhua and Hakha requesting them to come to the plains. Captain Raikes met with four Sizang Chiefs, Ton Suang, Hau Suang (brother of Sizang Chief Khup Pau), Do Son and Ten Sang on 26 December 1887 at Kalaymyo monastery. He also met with Kamhau delegate Pu Lun Sat on 8 March 1888. Zokhua and Haka chiefs not only refused to meet Captain Raikes but also killed two messengers sent by him.

Capt. Raikes arrived at Indin (principal village of Kalay Sawbwa) on 17 March 1887 and held a meeting with Sawbwa Maung Pagyi. During that time, the Kalay valley was in turmoil as civil war broke out between the old Sawbwa (Maung Yit) and new Sawbwa Maung Pagyi. Moreover, the Sizang Chin taking advantage of the civil war, descended from the hills and raided the valley. Prior to the British annexation of the Kalay valley, the Sawbwa in the Kalay valley and the Fahlam council had defensive and offensive alliance. Consequently, Pu Con Bik (the leader of the Fahlam Council) gave protection to the valley and when other Chin tribes raided the plains, the Tashon army then punished those responsible for the raids. Captain Raikes and Sawbwa Maung Pa Gyi discussed ways to end the civil war and how they can protect Kalay valley from Chin raids. The British arrested old Sawbwa Maung Yit and his associates and sent them to Jail in Mandalay and to stop the Chins from raiding the plains, Captain Raikes noted in his diary as thus: To attain immunity from raids without recourse to assures it will be necessary to talk with the Chiefs of the Chin tribes of the five principal tribes within raiding distance of the Kale [Kalay] country. The Tashon tribe is the most powerful and the Tashon Mingyi is looked up to by the Chiefs of the remaining tribes; the Tashon tribe has fortunately been friendly towards Kale [Kalay], all raids have been confined to the Siyin [Sizang] and Sagyilain [Sakhiling] tribes. The Sawbwa has sent out a deputation to ascertain whether the Tashon Mingyi [Pu Con Bik] will meet him in the course of a few weeks when they prepare to go through the usual formal ceremonies which are customary when contract are made with the Chin tribes. A messenger was sent to Fahlam (The capital of Tashon tribes) and Tashon Mingyi (Fahlam Chief) Pu Con Bik sent seven men as a delegation to Indin (principal village of Kalay Swabwa).

Anglo – Tashon Conferences  
The Tashon delegation and Capt. Raikes met on 21 March 1887 and Capt. Raikes said "The British had permanently annexed upper Burma, that the Swabwa of Kale had been nominated by the British government and that raiding on villages in the Kale country and Kabaw valley on the right bank of the Chindwin between Kalay and Thaungthut must ceased". The delegate replied that "As soon as the Kale Sawbwa has established his headquarter and a formal contract had been entered into, the chiefs of the Tashon tribe would call upon the chief of the sagyilian [Sakhiling], Kamhau tribe to agree to stop raid and in case of them failing to come in and agreeing to the raid the Tashons tribe would be willing to help the Sawbwa and to assist him in fighting tribes which continue raids in the kale country". After the meeting, Capt. Raikes show the power of rifle to the Tashons delegation and they were astonished. Capt. Raikes remarks that "I think this has a better effect than the present I gave them yesterday". Captain Raikes then arranged a further meeting with the Tashons principal Chief Pu Con Bik. The meeting was arranged at Indin but Pu Con Bik refused to go, instead, he asked Captain Raikes to come to Sihaung. Captain Raikes then ride to Sihaung which is 12.75 miles from Indin. When he arrived at Sihaung, Pu Con Bik then asked him to come to a small village within the Chin territory called Kaanhla, 2 miles south west of Sihaung. Captain Raikes and Pu Con Bik met on 3 January 1888.

The main discussion was about opening a trade route to India through Chin Hills. Pu Con Bik refused to agree and even reluctant to negotiate about a trade route. During the first Anglo–Tashon conference, Capt. Raikes successfully showed off the power of rifle guns. This time, he prepared a cannon and fire two volleys and five rounds of independent firing. Captain Raikes showed off the might and power of the British force and tried to scare off the Chin, however, it was a bad move as Pu Con Bik started to get doubt on the intention of the British. He realized that the British would invade eventually, thus, he prepared for war from this point on ward. Coincidentally, the old Sawbwa Maung Yit and his associates broke out of Mandalay prison and seek asylum in Tashon capital, Fahlam which they were all granted asylum. The Tashons were suspicious after their interview with Captain Raikes, and the Shan sawbwa persuaded them to espouse the cause of the Shwegyophyu Prince, and to aid him in fighting against the British Government. Pu Con Bik also granted political asylum to Shwegyopyu Prince (son of Kanung Mintha) who was wanted by the British for killing two British officers at the Chinbyit Battle.

Raiding British Burma 
A combine force of Tashons, Sizang, Kamhau, Sukte and the Burmese launched an offensive against the British by raiding Indin on 4 May 1888 and occupied Sihaung and Indin. They also attacked British military police posts at Kalaymyo and Kanpale (No.1 Stockades). This was followed by incursions into the plains in which the Yazagyo and Homalin were targeted. The Sizang warriors attacked Chitpauk on 17 October and Kantha on 22 September. Sukte and Kamhau tribes also attacked the Kabaw valley destroying Khampat in their wake. A combined force of Sizang warriors and Burman led by Sawbwa Maung Yit occupied Yazagyo. The British forces then quickly reinforced and counterattack the Chin warriors. The Chin warriors then retreated back to Chin Hills. Pu Con Bik also made an alliance with tribes from Hakha, Zokhua and Sakta areas which were to act in accord with the Tashons. The combined force of Chin warriors and Burman under the leadership of Tashons were as follows
 
 14 October 1888: Hmanbin was attacked by 30 Burmans led by Amatgyi Maung Tha Dun. Shwegyophyu led warriors attacked Minledaung (Minlaytaung).
 17 October 1888: Chitpauk, 4 miles from Yazagyo was attacked by 100 Sizang warriors. Seven men were killed and 45 carried off.
 17 October 1888: Taungo was attacked by 14 Sizang warriors. 
 20 October 1888: Kalaymyo was attacked by 400 Sizang Chins at 4a.m. They burnt 35 houses, killed 3 Burmans, wounded 4, and carried away 40 men. Four Chins were killed and five badly wounded. A party of police from Kanbale followed Chins for 3 miles, but no come up with them. 
 23 October 1888: The Tashon force attack the British posts around Myitha valley. 
 24 October 1888: British post also known as No.1 Stockade, Kanbale was attacked by 50 Burmans which was held by Kabaw valley police. Two villagers were killed and six carried away. The village which is 50 yards from the stockade, was burnt. My report states that the sepoys neither went out to assist the villagers nor fired a shot. It was full moon. 
 22 October 1888: Kantha was attacked by Sizang. 32 captives taken. 
 29 October 1888: Chin numbering 300 attacked and burnt Khampat killing 7 and carried off 27. 
 29 October 1888: The Tashon force attacked Kanyi and Laungshe villages. 
 30 October 1888: 37 Burman led by Bo La headed for Sagaing.

As the Chins and Burman forces attacked across the Kalay and Kabaw valleys, the British Army then prepared for the annexation of Chin Hills. The British administration then sent ultimatum to the Sizang chief to deliver Khai Kam together with the captives whom he carried off. Ultimatum was also sent to the Fahlam Council to deliver the Shwegyophyu prince and his followers. The British believed that the invasions of the plains were instigated by fugitives Shwegyophyu Prince, old Shan Sawbwa. When those ultimatums were ignored by the Sizang and the Fahlam council, the British force then prepared to launch expedition known as The Chin-Lushai Expedition (1888–1889). The British spent the month of November 1888 preparing for the expedition. Brigadier-General Faunce and Captain Raikes, established defensive positions along the valley. A levy of Military Police (later 2nd Battalion of Burma Rifle) guarded the Yaw valley against the depredations of the Southern Chins. Capt. Raikes and his assistant Mr. Hall collecting intelligence about the Chin, their village and the routes into the hills. Hills coolies were collected in Assam and sent for the expeditions. The forces for the expedition were gathered at Kanpale (Stockade No.1) and 42 Gurkha Battalion was added for the expeditions.

The Chin – Lushai Expedition (1888–1889) – Eastern Chin Hills 
The British army strategy was to first march against the Sizang head village Khuasak, then deal with the surrounding villages. The route selected for the advance of the column was from Kanpale to the summit of Leisan range. There was no road to the hills at that time, therefore, a road had to be constructed for the main invading force and their heavy weaponry. At the beginning of December 1888, the road (mule track) construction was completed until the foot of the hill, there they established No.2 Stockade i.e. Zawlkin (now Khai Kam Town). The road construction continued towards the hills and the reach at Phatzang where a rough No.3 stockade was established. On hearing the news of the British advance, the combined force of Sizang, Kamhau and Sukte attacked the British force. The Sizang were in constant co-ordination with the Tashons. On 10 December 1888, the great force of Tashon made a simultaneous attack on the villages of Sihaung, Kyawywa and Kundu. At the same time, 80 Tashons warriors clashed head to head with 42 Gurkha Light infantry led by Captain Westmoreland. On the same date, the Sizang attacked Indin and a combined force of Sukte and Kamhau attacked the military post at Kangyi (20 miles north of Kalemyo). The Chins showed their planning abilities and military capabilities in this simultaneous attack to the various British positions. The British officers were impressed by the Chin capabilities as political officers B.S Carey & H.N. Tuck wrote in the Chin Hills: "The Chins were in great force, and we now know that Tashons and Siyins (Sizang) were fighting side by side on this occasion. The Chins swooped down from the heights on to the party, which was working on a narrow spur, and attacked them from all four sides, fighting under cover of heavy undergrowth. The collies bolted and the troops fell back after holding their ground some little time. Whilst disputing every stage of our advance into their hills, the Chins showed considerable tactical ability by taking the offensive in the plains and attacking Shan villages and our posts in the rear of advancing column".
 
Since, the Chin showed their military skills by inflicting some losses on the invading forces, the British Army took the Chin seriously. General Sir. George White Commander-in-Chief of Burma, personally came to supervise the expedition. He arrived in Kanpale (near Kalaymyo) on 30 December 1888 and accompanied the expedition forces. The Chin warrior built a stockade at Leisan Mual (Red Rocky Gate) and stood firm. On 27 January 1889, the Chin warriors attacked the road workers and the British send their troops to engage with the Chin warriors. The Chin warriors gave them strong resistance but the British firepower forced the Chin warriors to retreat. The Chin warriors then stood firm at Leisen Mual stockade which is the last line of defence. The British couldn't take the stockade so reinforced was then ordered then the British Force charged again and the stockade was occupied. As the last line of defence was breached by the superior British force, the door to the Sizang valley was wide open. The British forces march to Leisang range, from there they can see the villages within Sizang valley. General George White described his experience of the battles with the Chin as "The most difficult enemy to see or hit I ever fought" The British forces defeated the Sizang and established Fort White post, in honour of General George White. After the British force established Fort White post, Major Raikes remained as Political Officer and Colonel Skene in command of the troops in Chin Hills. After the villages of the Sizang and Kamhau were destroyed, they were living in encampments near their respective cultivation. Although they were beaten by a far superior force and driven by their village, they showed no sign of surrender and attack the British post whenever they had opportunity.  They ambushed the British, they cut telegraph cables and stole cattle from the British whenever possible. The Sizang resisted the British from the forest for two years.

After the Chin – Lushai Expedition of 1888–1889, Major Raikes then opened up negotiations wiih the Tashons, however, Pu Bawi Hmung from Fahlam Council informed the Major Raikes that the Tashons refused to surrender the Shwegyophyu Prince and his associates, and they were not in a position to enforce the surrender of the Burman captives held by the Sizang and Kamhau. The British wanted to advance to Tashon territory however, as the monsoon season was closing, the expedition to Tashons territory had to be postponed for the year. At the end of 1888–1889, the British force suffered 67 casualties during the expedition and the state of affairs was that all the Sizang and 18 of the Kamhau villages had been destroyed, and the British troops now occupied their tract (northern Chin Hills). The Tashons continued to grant political asylum to Shwegyophyu Prince and his associates. In the East, the Chin-Lushai Expedition 1888–1889 started in December 1888 and largely ended in May 1889 after the battle of Siallum.

The Chin – Lushai Expedition (1888–1889) – Western Chin Hills 
The British army invaded Western Chin Hills which is now part of Mizoram, in 1871-72 known as the Lushai Expedition (1871–72). Then there was relative peace in the western border until the murder of Lt. J.F. Stewart, 1st Battalion of Leinster Regiment by Lungtian chief Hau Sata on 03 Feb 1888. Lt. Stewart with his bodyguards were surveying for the road construction at 18 miles east of Rangamati and were to work southward towards Bilaicharai. They were ambushed at their camp in the dawn of 03 Feb 1888, by 300-armed man led by Lungtian Chief called Hau Sata. They killed Lt.Steward and 3 of his bodyguards. Lt. Stewart head was cut off and taken to Thangzang village. Soon after the incident, the British army sent a punitive force to avenge the murder. On 15 March 1889, 1000 British soldiers led by Col. Tregear known as “The Chin-Lushai Expedition 1888-89” marched toward western Chin Hills to punish Hau Sata and Thantlang Chief Za Huat. This expedition started on 28 January 1889 and ended in April 1889. They conquered part of the Western Chin Hills including Hau Sata village of Lungtian and Fort Tregear was established at Darzo.

The Chin – Lushai Expedition (1889–1890) 
The Sizangs and Kamhau were active in the northern Chin Hills attacking the British posts whenever they had opportunity. The Tashons still giving protection to Shwegyophyu Prince and his associates. In August 1889, Chief Commissioner of the British Crown Colony of Burma Sir Charles Crosthwaite visited the Kalay area and after discussing matters with Major Raikes issued a proclamation to the Tashons. The Chief Commissioner Major Raikes declared to the Tashons that his intention of sending a force to their chief village [Fahlam] and promised the Tashons immunity from punishment and an amnesty for past offences on condition that they assisted the troops in their march and did their best to compel the Sizang and Kamhau to surrender their captives. The Chiefs were required also to meet the officer in command of the British force at the chief village [Fahlam], to deliver up all captives in possession of the tribe, and to pay a fine of Rs. 10,000. The payment annually of two elephant tusks and ten silk sheets as tribute was made a further condition. Failure to comply with these terms would involve the severest punishment Being unwilling to drive the Tashons to extremities, the Chief Commissioner waived the condition previously imposed which required the surrender of the Shwe Gyo Byu Prince and made no mention of the demand for the delivery of guns by the Sukte and Sizang.

Strategy for the operation
Orders for an expedition known as The Chin-Lushai Expedition (1889–1890) from Burma and Chittagong were issued from Army headquarters in Burma and India on 5 September 1889. The troops operating from Burma were divided into two columns, one called the Fort White column (or) northern column operating from Fort White as a base against the Sizang and the tribes between the base and the Manipur river. The other called the Gangaw column (or) southern column starting from Gangaw as a base and advancing via Zokhua on Haka. A force called the Chittagong column was to march from Lunglei to Haka, making the road as it advanced. After the arrival of the force at Hakha, the columns were to move northward against the Tashons and in such other directions as the General Officer in command might decide in consultation with the Political Officers. The objects of the expedition were declared to be the punishment of tribes which had committed raids in British territory and had declined to make amends, the subjugation of neutral tribes which had come within our sphere of dominion, the exploration of the country between Burma and Chittagong, and the establishment, if necessary, of semi-permanent posts in the hills to ensure complete pacification and the recognition of British power. Brigadier- General W. P. Symons was placed in command of the expedition with full control in political as well as military matters.

Final negotiation 
Prior to the launch of this Chin-Lushai Expedition, Major Raikes and the Tashons leaders held final negotiation at Sihaung. Major Raikes asked the Tashon leaders to accept the British proclamation, pay tributes annually to the British government, or the British army will annex the Tashons territory. The Tashons leaders simply refused to accept the proclamation. As this final negotiation was not fruitful, both sides prepare for war.

Military Operations 
While the Chittagong column and southern column were marching towards Hakha, the Fort White column launched operations from September 1889 until December 1889 to subdue the Sizangs, Kamhau and Sukte, however, they could not defeat them. They burned their houses and destroyed their crops, however, the Chin continued to fight from the jungle. The British realized that the Sizangs would not be defeated by merely burning their houses and destroying their crops, therefore, they started negotiation for them to surrender. Chin Hills political officers Mr. B.S. Carey managed to open communication channel with the Sakhiling Chief Mang Lun and he did surrender to the British on 17 January. His surrender was significant to the British and through him negotiations were carried out to others Sizangs leaders. Chief Mang Lun also informed the Political Officer that the conduct of the Sizang tribe would depend entirely on the result of the Tashon expedition, and that, if the Tashons did not fight, the Sizangs were not prepared to continue the struggle alone. The British then temporarily abandoned military operations to the Sizangs, who resisted under the leadership of Pu Khai Kam. Their focus turned to the invasion of Tashon territory. The British believed that Sizangs would also surrender if Tashon submit to the British. Meanwhile, The 3,400 strong Chittagong Column led by Brigadier Tregear marched from Lunglei and Fort Tregear and annexed the western Chin Hills i.e. Thantlang areas. The 1,869 strong Gangaw/Burma column led by General W. Symond marched from Kan – Pakokku towards Zokhua. Eventually Zokhua, Sakta and Hakha surrendered to General Symonds. The Chittagong column and the Southern column had got in touch via light signal at Thau, 53 miles west of Hakha. The two columns then met at Hakha and preparation were made to advance to the Tashons capital Fahlam.

Three Pronged Invasion to the Tashon capital, Fahlam 
The southern column consists of 100 rifle soldiers from King's Own Scottish Borderers, 164 rifle soldiers from Second and Fourth Gurkha Rifles including two mountain guns led by General Symond marched towards Fahlam on 10 March 1890. The Southern column marched from Hakha via Mangkheng to Fahlam. When the column reached to Mangkheng, the Chief of Mangkheng chief Kawl Ul tried his utmost to dissuade the Southern column from advancing towards the Tashon capital, Fahlam. Again, when the southern column approaching Fahlam, Tashons leader's Pu Con Bik and Pu Mang Hlur warned the column not to cross the area. The southern column advanced and camped at a place called Ngalzawl. Ngalzawl is midway between current Tashon village and Zamual village. The 1,622 strong Fort White Column led by Colonel Skene marched from Fort White – Bualkhua – Lati and camped at Parte village. At 8 a.m. on the morning of 11 March 1890 signalling communication was established between the southern column and Fort White column. In order to let the Tashons know about the arrival of the British columns, the Fort White column fired three blank rounds from the gun, whilst three large dynamite cartridges were exploded by the Southern column. In the afternoon of 11 March 1890, the Tashons leaders including Pu Con Bik, Pu Mang Hlur, Pu Kha Lian, Pu Bawi Hmung, Pu Vum Ceu and a minor official called Shin Lay and General Symons met at Ngalzawl and Gen. Symons read out the terms which had already been sent to the Tashons by Major Raikes. To the British intense surprise, the Tashon leaders firmly and politely declined to acknowledge the supremacy of the British Government. General Symons then gave a stern warning to carefully consider their final answer, which was to be given within two days. Surgeon Lt.Col. A.S. Reid remarked as thus their decision and straightforward boldness in giving it, when their capital was at the mercy of the united columns of the British troops, whom they had permitted and assisted to march on it, was a remarkable.

3,000 Chin Warriors 
The Fahlam Council managed to raise 3,000 Chin warriors to counterattack the invading British forces and gathered at Fahlam. The warriors were from all corners of Chin Hills and full of armed and prepared for the battle. Among the warriors was the Tashon Chiefs dressed in the gaudy tartan of the tribe, well-armed with bright guns, vermilion and black parti-coloured sword scabbards, and beautifully inlaid powder-horns. The Hualngo were conspicuous by their chignons, which contrasted with the lofty headdress of their neighbours, the Kamhau, who were present carrying the strange "Shendu" chopper-shaped sword in basketwork scabbards. The Sizangs, Khuangli, Tawyan, Minledaung and Sukte warriors were also present. The congregation was armed with a variety of weapons such as spears and flint-lock guns, bows and quivers of barbed arrows. The Tashons built fortifications along the Manipur River to intercept the northern column. The line of fortifications commenced on the river bank, the first stockade commanding the Lumbang stream. All fords in the river were commanded by sangars built with boulders and rocks, some of which exceeded 100 yards in length. From the river to Fahlam village the road passed through innumerable stockades, rifle-pits, and saagars which had been constructed with enormous labour. The Chin calculated that it was better to face the invaders halfway at Falam to deny further advance to the inner hills. Some must have taken the opportunity to be there to satisfy their curiosity about Fahlam, the centre of power at that time. The Fahlam could have asked help from all nooks and corners. It must have been an honour for some to have come to the side of Tashons in time of need. For some it could have been an obligation. Whatever the reason, 3000 Chins of various tribes under the leadership of Pu Con Bik stood against the invading enemy. The gathering for war was a show of loyalty to each other, the recognized virtue of Chins. Most importantly of all it was a reunion of separated brethren in time of danger to fight side by side against a foreign enemy. 
Seeing the mass number of warriors, the British political officers remarked as thus; Doubtless it was the presence of this large force drawn from so many tribes and from the very borders of the Lushai country that Position of the induced the Tashon Chiefs to show a bold front, fully believing that with our small force we should be alarmed at the display of the Chin strength. The Chiefs when they informed General Symons that they would not pay tribute were quite sincere and intended to fight rather than pay, though they preferred to gain their end without fighting if possible. It must be remembered that the Tashons held a unique position in Chinland at this time. Ail the tribes from Manipur to Haka and from Burma to Lushai owed them nominal allegiance and the Tashons, realized that their prestige would be gone and the name of Falam lowered in the eyes of Chinland if they in common with the petty clans had to pay tribute and acknowledge the supremacy of the white men. Wooden stockades, blocking in reverse and in all directions the path of approach to the Fahlam from the north. Every point of vantage was protected with crow's nest and masked stockade.

Submission of the Tashons
General Symons pressed to the Tashons leaders to decide on whether to accept the terms imposed by the British. The Tashons knew their situation best, while keeping the 3,000 warriors at Fahlam in line ready for combat they counselled patience and applied their tested tactics of negotiations in accordance with the changing events as dictated by the British. They refused to accept the terms of the British to pay a fine of ten thousand rupees, ten elephants tusk and ten silk sheets. The Tashons leaders said plainly that they would not pay annual tribute, nor were they sure whether they would pay the fine, or any portion of it. They had not used money and they had not got the money they asked. They would not be able to get the silks as the British prevented them from trading with Kalay valley so they could not get any. A great tension developed and the shadow of fighting loomed large. To convince the Chin war party the British troops at that juncture with primitive weapons amounted to self-annihilation. They decided to disperse but to resist the invaders at advantageous ground as the enemy advanced. The Chin defended their villages as much as they could. They harassed the British troops on the way. They did not give up easily. Only when the British resorted to destroying hidden stored grains and cutting up standing corps in the cultivation fields did the Chins started to negotiate for peaceful settlement. To come to Fahlam to face the enemy and to have come to a consensus resolution to disperse for the time being to gain far better fighting grounds and time to defend the land reflected the true spirit of nationalism.

At 1pm on 13 March 1890, the four leaders of Tashons including Pu Bawi Hmung and Pu Vum Ceu and some 20 men, the leaders of the war party, were in discussion with General Symons, General Commanding Officer Mr. Ross and Mr. B.S. Carey (political officer with the northern column). The Tashons leaders having doubtful to the result of the battle decide to accept the terms. The leaders said "We acknowledge that you have beaten us, that you are the conquerors, but as you are strong be merciful and reduce the fines which we can not pay, and the amount of tribute which we ask to be allowed to pay once in three years, we wish to accept your terms and be friends". Eventually, the reduced terms proposed by the Tahsons was accepted by Gen Symons as "General Symons did not wish to be too severe on a tribe which acknowledged itself defeated". The tribute was to be 5050 rupees annually. The Tashons did not lose their prestige nor their position in Chin Hills as the terms were to only pay annual tribute to the British government. After the Tashon had agreed to pay tributes to the British, General Symons returned to Hakha and also the Northern column returned to Fort White. The Tashon leaders agreed to send representative men with the northern column to try and get the Sizangs and Kamhau to surrender. The northern column started on its return march to Fort White on 15 March, taking two Tashons leaders with them. The Sizang and northern Chin also surrendered to the British in April 1890. However Tashon Chief Bawi Hmung and Khualsim Chief said that they would not give up Shwegyophyu prince nor way where he was, because they had sworn the oath of friendship with him. Shwegyophyu later returned to Burma and he was arrested, tried, and hanged in 1891.

Second Expedition to Fahlam (March 1891) 
Although, the Tashons accepted to give tributes to the British government in March 1890, the British did not rule the Tashons territory directly. The Tashons kept their power, prestige and continue to collect tributes from vassal tribes as before. The Tashons indirectly continued to oppose the British force. They themselves did not confront the British directly, however, they instigated the Chin people from the north and south to rebel against the British. Rebelling against the British force grew in 1891 and the British made Tashons accountable for every incident. To punish the Tashons for insurgents, the British troops then marched to the Tashons capital Fahlam in March 1891.

On 10 March 1891, the column consisted of 3 guns No. 3 Mountain Battery under Lieutenant O'Leary, 150 rifles, 3-4th Gurkhas under Captain Carnegy, 150 rifles, 30th Garhwal Rifles under Lieutenant Evatt, 35 rifles, 4th Madras Pioneers under Captain Stevens and 300 rifles and two guns under the command of Colonel Mainwaring accompanied by Mr. Ross and Lieutenant Macnabb, Political Officers, marched from Haka to Fahlam. They arrived at Ngalzawl on 13 March. As in 1890, the northern column also marched to Fahlam from Fort White and camped at Parte. The Tashons also gathered a large force around their capital Fahlam and both the British columns were very closely monitored by the Chin warriors.

On 14 March 1891, a durbar was held at Ngalzawl and Captain Rundall (the Political Officer with the Fort White column), Mr. Ross and the Tashons chiefs were present at the durbar. The Tashons paid 5 mithun as tributes to the British. The question of the tribal responsibility of the Tashons for the Gungal, who had committed the murders on the Fort White-Kale road, was discussed. It was decided that the Tashons would deliver up the offenders, who were reported to have fled into the Lushai country, should they at any time return to their territory, and agree to pay a fine and be responsible for their future good behaviour. For that incident, the British political officers set fine at four mithun and two guns. The British columns wanted to enter the capital Fahlam, however, the Tashons chiefs objected, consequently, the troops did not march through Fahlam and returned to their respective bases i.e. Hakha and Fort White.

The Fall of Fahlam (13 March 1892) 
After the expedition of March 1891, the Tashons promised the British of good behaviours, however, Throughout 1891, the Chin people continued to rebel against the British. The British had it enough and prepared to rule the Tashons directly and put Chin Hills under their firm control. For this, they prepared the final expedition to the capital. In March 1892, the British force then prepared another expedition to the capital with two columns as in 1890 and 1891 expeditions. The political officer of Chin Hills Mr. B.S. Carey writes about the needs for the British to keep under their direct rule as thus: "Throughout Chin Hills, Tashons were regarded as powerful rivals to ourselves, it was therefore necessary to bring this tribe under our control, so that our authority in the country might be universal and paramount. The Tashons had, however, never shown any active hostility towards us, and instructions were therefore issued to the effect that, while promptly suppressing any resistance that might be met with, every effort was to be used to carry out the programme peaceably and to avoid recourse to military force. As the Tashons and their tributaries were supposed to be able to muster 10,000 fighting men, two columns were told off for the expedition". The two columns consisted of the followings: 
The column from Hakha under Major Hewlett, and Burma Regiment, consisted of Royal Artillery, Section No. 8, B. M. B., Lieutenant Knapp, and 65 men. 
King's Royal Rifles, three officers and loo rifles under Major Gunning. 
10 rifles, 4th Madras Pioneers. 130 rifles and 20 mounted infantry, Burma Battalion, under Captain Presgrave. 
360 coolies and 200 mules, Darjeeling cooly corps, Lieutenant Watson, King's Royal Rifles, in charge. 
Staff Officer— Lieutenant Evatt, 39th Garhwal Rifles. 
Medical Officer— Surgeon-Captain Newland, I.M.S.
The column from Hakha was originally to have started in February 1892, however, they could only march on 10 March 1892. For some time before the column started marching, the British sent spies and reported that the Tashons also prepare for war. Military intelligence from the Fort White column also reported the warlike intentions of the Tashons. At this point, the Tashons tried to persuade the Hakha in the south and the Sizangs and Sukte in the north to bring about a general uprising, but failed to win over those tribes. Failing in the general uprising attempt, the Tashon Chiefs met with the Lt. Macnabb from the Hakha column at Mangkheng. Lt. Macnabb pointed out to the Tashons that resisting such the British columns will be catastrophic for the Tashons. The Hakha column arrived at Ngalzawl on 13 March 1892 and the northern column also arrived at Parte on 13 March 1892. The Tashons chiefs were told that for the first time in their history that the British intended to occupy their proud capital Fahlam. The Tashons strongly objected. The Tashons thought that the British would camp at Ngalzawl for a few days and left as they had done in the previous two expeditions. However, the British troops marched towards Fahlam but the Tashons offered no resistance and the village was peacefully occupied by the British force.

On 14 March reinforcement from the Gungal column also marched to Fahlam, having camped the previous night 2 miles below the village. Mr. Carey then joined Lieutenant Macnabb and the Falam Chiefs were summoned to talk over affairs. The Tashon chiefs were informed that their village had been occupied as an imposition of punishment for their breach of faith, in attempting to instigate a general uprising against the British force and the British intend to establish a permanent post at Fahlam. The Tashons were forbidden in future to levy tribute from the Kamhau, Sizangs or Sakhiling. So long as the Chiefs were obedient and loyal their rights and privileges would be maintained and their authority assured both over the Tashons and over their tributaries. The Chiefs were warned that any tributary tribes who offered resistance when visited by our officers would be removed from their control and administered direct. The Government also reserved the right of taking over the direct administration of any tributaries who were un- willing to remain subject to the Tashon Chiefs or whom they were unable to control. Then, the British occupied the village of Tashon (approximately one mile to the west of Fahlam). The following day on 14 March 1892, the British force marched in Tashons to show the might of the British force.

The Founding of the current city of Falam (April 1892) 
Though, the Tashons chiefs were defeated they still objected the British force to establish a post at Fahlam. The British then tried to make their temporary post i.e. Tashon village permanent which was garrisoned by 400 Garhwal rifles under Major Browne, D.S.O., with a small detachment of Madras Sappers under Lieutenant Ainslie, R.E., Mr. Tuck in political charge. However, the Tashon village was condemned on medical grounds in April 1892. The British decided to build a new post from scratch at three miles north west of Fahlam. The Tashon village was condemned and materials were used to build their new post. The Tashons supplied thirty thousand collies for the construction of their new post which is the current city of Falam. The British decided to name their newly built post Fahlam after the Tashons capital in order to demonstrate that they have conquered the Tashons. The Tashons were forced to rename their capital "Tashons" after the name of their tribes. The British had problems to pronounce Fahlam, hence, they called and wrote it as "Falam", omitting (h) aspirated sound. Since then, it has been called and known as Falam. Falam was the administration centre of Chin Hills during the colonial era. It was the headquarter of Chin Hills Battalion. It was the capital of Chin Hills. In 1948, Chin State joined the Union of Burma and gained independence from the British government. Since independence it was the capital of Chin State until 1965. Falam was founded on mid-1892 and it had just celebrated its 125th anniversary in February 2017.

Tashon Village 
The Tashons' capital Fahlam became Tashon village in 1892. The village is still standing and is very popular with tourist nowadays. The Tashon village was named Chin Heritage Village in 2016 and holds heritage status in Chin State.

See also 
 List of ethnic groups in Myanmar

References 

Ethnic groups in Myanmar